Dame Marjorie Louise Bean DBE (25 May 1909 – 16 March 2001) was the first Bermudian woman to be appointed to Bermuda's former Legislative Council. She was a trustee and founding member of the Bermuda Public Services Union (BPSU).

Life 
She began her career in education teaching English and geography at the Berkeley Institute. In 1948, she became the first black person to be appointed to an administrative position in Bermuda's Department of Education when she took on the job of Supervisor of Schools. She attended Wilberforce University (in Ohio), Columbia University's Teachers College (in New York City), and the Institute of Education at the University of London.

Awards
Dr. Bean was made a Member of the Order of the British Empire (MBE) "in recognition of the significant contribution she made to education in Bermuda" in 1968. She was later advanced to Officer (OBE) in 1981, and, lastly, to Dame (DBE) in 1995. In 1977 she was awarded the Queen's Silver Jubilee Medal.

Death
She died, aged 91, on 16 March 2001.

References

External links
 
 
 

1909 births
2001 deaths
Dames Commander of the Order of the British Empire
Teachers College, Columbia University alumni
Alumni of the University of London
Wilberforce University alumni
Bermudian women in politics
Place of birth missing
20th-century British women politicians